István Horváth (12 July 1910 – 15 July 1976) was a Hungarian athlete. He competed in the men's shot put at the 1936 Summer Olympics. He was born in Budapest.

References

1910 births
1976 deaths
Athletes (track and field) at the 1936 Summer Olympics
Hungarian male shot putters
Olympic athletes of Hungary
Athletes from Budapest